The list of shipwrecks in April 1833 includes some ships sunk, foundered, grounded, or otherwise lost during April 1833.

1 April

2 April

4 April

5 April

8 April

10 April

11 April

14 April

20 April

21 April

22 April

24 April

25 April

26 April

28 April

29 April

Unknown date

References

1833-04